Drabeši may refer to:

 Drabeši parish, an administrative unit of the Amata municipality, Latvia
 Drabeši (village), the administrative centre of Drabeši parish
 Drabeši Manor, a manor in the historical region of Vidzeme, in northern Latvia